is a name shared by two railway stations in the Namba district of Chūō-ku, Osaka, Japan. One is owned by Nankai Electric Railway, while the other is by the Osaka Metro. The names of both stations are written in hiragana on signage within the stations, because the kanji "難波" can be also read "Naniwa". However, the name of both stations officially employs kanji, printed on train tickets.

They are close to JR Namba Station and Ōsaka Namba Station.

Lines
Nankai Electric Railway (NK01)
Nankai Main Line
Nankai Koya Line

 (M20)
 (S16)
(Y15)

Connecting Stations
Ōsaka Namba Station (renamed from Kintetsu Namba Station in 2009)
Kintetsu Namba Line
Hanshin Namba Line
 JR Namba Station (renamed from Minatomachi Station in 1994)
Kansai Main Line (Yamatoji Line)

Nankai Electric Railway

Layout
There are nine bay platforms with eight tracks on the third floor. Nankai Terminal Building is located in front of the station. Ticket gates are located in the north of the platform, in the center on the second floor and in the south on the second floor.

Adjacent stations

Osaka Metro

Layout

Midōsuji Line
An island platform and a side platform with two tracks.

The Midōsuji Line station originally opened as an island platform serving two tracks, but overcrowding prompted construction of a side platform serving northbound trains (that platform opened in 1987). , the island platform serves only southbound trains, and the northbound side of the island platform is fenced off.

Sennichimae Line
An island platform with two tracks

Yotsubashi Line
An island platform with two tracks

History
The Nankai Electric Railway station opened on 29 December 1885. The Osaka Subway Midosuji Line station opened on 30 October 1935, the Yotsubashi Line station opened on 1 October 1965, and the Sennichimae Line opened on 11 March 1970.

Surrounding area
Takashimaya
Namba City
Namba Walk
Namba Parks
Swissôtel Nankai Osaka
Namba Expressway Bus Terminal
Osaka City Air Terminal (OCAT)
Parks Tower (Namba Parks)
Bic Camera
Minatomachi River Place (including FM OSAKA)
Namba Grand Kagetsu
Nankai Electric Railway headquarters
Osaka Prefectural Gymnasium
Ebisubashi Shopping Arcade
NMB48

See also
 List of railway stations in Japan

References

External links

 Nankai Electric Railway station information 
 Namba - Osaka Metro station Midosuji Line 
 Namba - Osaka Metro station Midosuji Line 
 Namba - Osaka Metro station Sennichimae Line 
 Namba - Osaka Metro station Sennichimae Line 
 Namba - Osaka Metro station Yotsubashi Line 
 Namba - Osaka Metro station Yotsubashi Line 

Chūō-ku, Osaka
Railway stations in Osaka
Osaka Metro stations
Railway stations in Japan opened in 1935